Lowe may refer to:

People
 Lowe (surname), a surname (including a list of people with the name)
 Liu, a Chinese surname sometimes romanized as Lowe

Places 
 Division of Lowe, an Australian federal government electoral division
 Lowe, Delaware, United States
 Lowe, Shropshire, a location in England
 Lowe Township, Moultrie County, Illinois, United States

Other uses 
 Lowe Alpine, American outdoor equipment manufacturer and supplier
 Löwe Automobil, German car-part manufacturer
 Lowe (band), Swedish synthpop band
 Lowe and Partners, global advertising agency network, now part of MullenLowe Group
 Löwe, the traditional name of the assistant to the Scharfrichter (executioner)
 Panzer VII Löwe, a German tank

See also 
 Lowe Gardens
 Lowe's, an American retail chain
 Löw
 Lowes (disambiguation)
 Löwe (disambiguation)
 Low (disambiguation)